The Afghan Mobile Mini Children's Circus (MMCC) is a traveling educational entertainment group in Afghanistan. MMCC accepts children aged 5–17 to learn juggling, unicycling, acrobatics, singing, comedy, theater and magic tricks.  Their goal is to bring laughter back to the children of the war-torn country. 
 
The Mobile Mini-Circus for Children was established as a nonprofit organization established in 2002 to work with orphaned and traumatized children. After decades of war, the Mobile Mini-Circus for Children aims to unlock the creativity and spirit of fun in Afghan children by bringing tools for storytelling, performance, and public expression to children across Afghanistan. Circus members act as teachers for the children, holding three days of workshops on circus skills such as puppetry, walking on stilts, and juggling. With help from circus trainers and a group of traveling children-artists, mostly orphans, Afghan children create a show for the community over the first two days and then perform it on the third day.

During the summer of 2006, a group of 13 MMCC children artists visited Japan to perform and make friendship across borders.

References

External links
 Circus website

Circuses
Circus schools
Theatre in Afghanistan